Bathseba (minor planet designation: 592 Bathseba) is a minor planet orbiting the Sun.

References

External links
 
 

Background asteroids
Bathseba
Bathseba
K-type asteroids (SMASS)
19060318